Euptera mimetica, the mimetic euptera, is a butterfly in the family Nymphalidae. It is found in eastern Nigeria, western Cameroon and the Republic of the Congo. The habitat consists of forests.

References

Euptera
Butterflies of Africa
Taxa named by Jean-Louis Amiet
Butterflies described in 1998